Ran Kevita 2, distributed as Ran Kevita II  - Gopaluge Wickrama in CEL and NFC Theatres, is a 2013 Sri Lankan Sinhala children's fantasy film directed by Udayakantha Warnasuriya and co-produced by Pravin Jayarathne, Ranjith Jayasooriya, Janitha Marasinghe and Udayakantha Warnasuriya for Millenium Entertainments. It is the sequel to 2007 film Ran Kevita directed by the same director. It stars Hisham Samsudeen and Harith Samarasinghe in lead roles along with Ananda Wickramage and Asela Jayakody. Music composed by Mahesh Denipitiya. It is the 1192nd Sri Lankan film in the Sinhala cinema.

The film has been shot in and around Colombo with the latest camera technology of Red camera.

Plot
Suran goes to town to spend the next vacation with Janith, and he takes Gopalu Yaka with him. They manage to hide Gopalu in the house but in town the demon hardly gets any place to hide from the sunlight which is unbearable to him. However at night, Gopalu become normal and active.

Cast
 Hisham Samsudeen as Janith
 Harith Samarasinghe as Suran
 Suneth Chithrananda as Gopalu (voice)
 Ananda Wickramage as Suran's father
 Susantha Chandramali as Suran's mother
 Bennet Rathnayake as Janith's father
 Sangeetha Basnayake as Janith's mother
 Madushani Janatree as Janith's sister
 Damitha Saluwadana as Sundari amma
 Asela Jayakody as Thief
 Don Gai as Thief
 Ananda Athukorala as Police sergeant
 Kumara Thirimadura as Supermarket thief
 Janesh Silva as Police sergeant
 Chathura Perera as Anton
 Nilmini Kottegoda as Complaint
 Chaminda Vaas in cameo appearance

Soundtrack

Box office
The film successfully passed 75 days of screening and more than 6 lakhs of people have been watched the movie at that period.

References

2013 films
2010s Sinhala-language films
Films directed by Udayakantha Warnasuriya